Cundinamarca was one of the three departments of Gran Colombia until 1824.

Overview
In the South-West it bordered the Department of Quito, in the East the Department of Venezuela

From 1824 onward the name was used for the Department of Cundinamarca of the Centro District of Gran Colombia.

Status

The name is no longer in use due to the implosion of Grande Columbia.

See also 
 Cundinamarca Department (1824)
 Cundinamarca Department

References

Departments of Gran Colombia
1820 establishments in Gran Colombia
1824 disestablishments in Gran Colombia
es:Departamento de Cundinamarca (Gran Colombia)